Operation Karbala-7 was a successful Iranian offensive in Haj Omran during the Iran–Iraq War to prevent Iraq from rapidly transferring units to its defense lines at Basra after Iran had launched Operation Karbala-5 to capture the city of Basra.

References 

Karbala-7
Erbil Governorate
History of Iraqi Kurdistan